For the entire A320 family, 160 aviation accidents and incidents have occurred (the latest accident with fatalities being Pakistan International Airlines Flight 8303 on 22 May 2020), including 37 hull loss accidents, and a total of  fatalities in 17 fatal accidents.

Through 2015, the Airbus A320 family has experienced 0.12 fatal hull-loss accidents for every million takeoffs, and 0.26 total hull-loss accidents for every million takeoffs; one of the lowest fatality rates of any airliner.

A319

2000s 
 On 19 January 2003, a Northwest Airlines Airbus A319-114 registered as N313NB, was damaged by maintenance personnel at LaGuardia Airport, Queens, New York, U.S. While being taxied from a maintenance area to the gate, the aircraft struck the gate and a Boeing 757, collapsing the nose gear. The Airbus was damaged beyond repair and written off.
 On 10 May 2005, a Northwest Airlines DC-9 collided on the ground with a Northwest Airlines Airbus A319 that had just pushed back from the gate at Minneapolis-Saint Paul International Airport, Hennepin County, Minnesota, U.S. The DC-9 suffered a malfunction in one of its hydraulic systems in flight. After landing, the captain shut down one of the plane's engines, inadvertently disabling the remaining working hydraulic system. Six people were injured and both planes were substantially damaged. The A319 was repaired and returned to service, the DC-9 was written off.

2010s 
 On 10 March 2010, Pegasus Airlines Flight 361, an Airbus A319 operated by IZair on a ferry flight, made an emergency landing at Frankfurt Airport, Germany after a malfunction in the nose gear. The flight landed safely but blew both front nose gear tires. The airport closed runway 07R/25L for 3 hours to allow recovery. The nose gear suffered the same problem as JetBlue Flight 292.
 On 12 August 2010, Azerbaijan Airlines Flight 075, an Airbus A319-111 registered as 4K-AZ04, suffered a undercarriage collapse when the aircraft departed the runway on landing at Atatürk International Airport, Istanbul, Turkey. The aircraft was substantially damaged but all 127 passengers and crew escaped unharmed. The aircraft was later repaired.
 On 24 September 2010, Wind Jet Flight 243, an Airbus A319-132 registered as EI-EDM, landed short of runway 07 while attempting a landing at Palermo Airport, Italy. The aircraft stopped in the grass out of the runway but was seriously damaged and was written off. 34 passengers suffered minor injuries.
 On 24 May 2013, British Airways Flight 762, using an Airbus A319-131 and registered as G-EUOE, returned to London Heathrow Airport after fan cowl doors detached from both engines shortly after take off. During the approach a fire broke out in the right engine and persisted after the engine was shut down. The aircraft landed safely with no injuries to the 80 people on board. The accident report revealed that the cowlings had been left unlatched following overnight maintenance. The separation of the doors caused airframe damage and the right hand engine fire resulted from a ruptured fuel pipe.
 On 14 May 2018, Sichuan Airlines Flight 8633, an Airbus A319-133 registered as B-6419, diverted to Chengdu Shuangliu International Airport after one of the cockpit windshields on the copilot's side blew out during the climb towards cruising altitude. The aircraft landed safely with injuries sustained only to the copilot and a cabin crew member.
 On 15 January 2019, an Afriqiyah Airways A319-111, registered 5A-ONC, was destroyed by gunfire at Mitiga International Airport in Tripoli, Libya.

2020s 
 On 12 May 2022, Tibet Airlines Flight 9833, an Airbus A319-100 veered off the runway on takeoff in Chongqing Jiangbei International Airport, causing fire. All 122 passengers and crew on board survived, with only minor injuries.

A320

1980s 
 On 26 June 1988, Air France Flight 296, a recently introduced Airbus A320-111, crashed on a demonstration flight at Mulhouse-Habsheim Airport, France. Three passengers (out of 136 on board) were killed. This is the first crash of an aircraft within the A320 family.

1990s 
 On 14 February 1990, Indian Airlines Flight 605, using an Airbus A320-231, carrying 146 people, crashed on its final approach to the HAL Airport, Bangalore. 88 passengers and four crew members were killed.
 On 20 January 1992, Air Inter Flight 148, using an Airbus A320-111, crashed into a high ridge near Mount Sainte-Odile in the Vosges mountains while on final approach to Strasbourg at the end of a scheduled flight from Lyon. This accident resulted in the deaths of 87 of the aircraft's occupants (six crew members, 90 passengers).
 On 14 September 1993, Lufthansa Flight 2904, using an Airbus A320-211, coming from Frankfurt am Main with 70 people, crashed into an earth wall at the end of the runway at Warsaw. A fire started in the left wing area and penetrated into the passenger cabin. The training captain and a passenger died.
 On 10 March 1997, a Gulf Air Airbus A320-212 (A4O-EM) aborted takeoff at Abu Dhabi International Airport and overran the runway, causing the nosegear to collapse. Everyone on board survived.
 On 22 March 1998, Philippine Airlines Flight 137, using an Airbus A320-214, crashed and overran the runway of Bacolod City Domestic Airport, RPVB, in Bacolod, Philippines, plowing through homes near it. None of the passengers or crew died, but many were injured and three on the ground were killed.
 On 16 February 1999, America West Airlines Flight 2811, an Airbus A320-231, received minor damage when it landed at Port Columbus International Airport, Ohio, with the nose wheels rotated 90 degrees. There were no injuries to the 31 people on board.

2000s 
 On 5 July 2000, Royal Jordanian Flight 435, an Airbus A320 while flying to Damascus International Airport, Syria, was hijacked by a Syrian national. The plane made an emergency landing back to Queen Alia International Airport, Jordan after the hijacker's grenade exploded, injuring 15 passengers and damaging the plane. The hijacker was shot and killed by an air marshal on board.
 On 23 August 2000, Gulf Air Flight 072, using an Airbus A320-212, crashed into the Persian Gulf on a go-around during a night visual approach to Bahrain Airport. All 143 passengers and crew on board lost their lives.
 On 7 February 2001, Iberia Airlines Flight 1456, using an Airbus A320-214, carrying 143 people, crashed on landing at Bilbao Airport in heavy low level turbulence and gusts. All occupants survived; aircraft was written off.
 On 21 September 2005, JetBlue Flight 292, using an Airbus A320-232, executed an emergency landing at Los Angeles International Airport (LAX) after the nose wheels jammed in an abnormal position. No one was injured.
 On 3 May 2006, Armavia Flight 967, using an Airbus A320-211, crashed into the Black Sea while attempting to conduct a go-around following its first approach to Sochi Airport, Russia. All 113 passengers and crew on board lost their lives. The accident was a Pilot error / Controlled flight into terrain accident.
 On 17 July 2007, TAM Airlines Flight 3054, using an Airbus A320-233, was not able to stop while landing at Congonhas International Airport in São Paulo, Brazil. One engine thrust reverser had been deactivated. As of 2009, the accident was caused by pilot error (by positioning the left throttle into reverse with the right engine throttle being in the climb power setting) and by bad weather (this was possibly exaggerated by the lack of effective drainage grooving on the runway). All 187 passengers and crew died with 12 fatalities on the ground, the ground fatalities mainly from the TAM headquarters and the petrol station at the end of the runway, totaling 199 people. This crash is the deadliest accident involving the A320.
 On 20 October 2007, Northwest Airlines Flight 1432, an Airbus A320-211, landed on runway 18 at Hector International Airport, North Dakota, with the nose gear rotated 90 degrees.
 On 26 October 2007, Philippine Airlines Flight 475, using an Airbus A320-214, from Butuan, overshot the runway in Bancasi Airport with 148 passengers, 19 were injured.
 On 30 May 2008, TACA Flight 390, using an Airbus A320-233, from San Salvador, overran the runway after landing at Toncontín International Airport in Tegucigalpa, Honduras, in bad weather conditions. There were five fatalities including two on the ground.
 On 27 November 2008, XL Airways Germany Flight 888T, a test flight of an A320-232 stalled in a low speed test and control could not be regained, causing the aircraft to crash into the sea off the southern French coast. The aircraft was on lease by XL Airways and scheduled to be returned to Air New Zealand. All seven people aboard died.

 On 15 January 2009, US Airways Flight 1549, using an Airbus A320-214, en route from New York City LaGuardia Airport to Charlotte, North Carolina, ditched into the Hudson River seven minutes after takeoff. The plane was piloted by Chesley B. "Sully" Sullenberger. All 150 passengers and five crew survived, with only five serious injuries. The accident was due to a collision with a flock of Canada geese, which disabled both engines. The entire airframe, including the wings, has been preserved at the Carolinas Aviation Museum and is now on display. This was also the first ditching of an A320.

2010s 
 10 January 2011: AirAsia Flight 5218, an Airbus A320-216 (9M-AHH), skidded off the runway at Kuching Airport, Malaysia. All 123 passengers and six crew members survived.
 20 April 2011: Vueling Airlines Flight 2220, an Airbus A320-211, landed with the nose gear rotated 90 degrees after an aborted approach and about 20 minutes in a holding pattern. The plane came to a safe stop with damage to the nose wheels and no injuries on board occurred.
 On 29 August 2011, Gulf Air Flight 270, using an Airbus A320-214, from Bahrain to Cochin carrying 143 people, skidded off the runway on landing due to pilot error. The weather was poor with heavy rain and strong winds. The aircraft was badly damaged and seven passengers were injured. Some people were reported to have jumped from an emergency exit when the evacuation slide failed to deploy.
 On 20 September 2012, Syrian Air Flight 501, using an Airbus A320-232, collided in mid-air with a military helicopter. The A320 lost approximately half its vertical stabilizer but landed safely; the helicopter crashed, killing three of its occupants.
 On 2 June 2013, Cebu Pacific Flight 971, using an Airbus A320-214, registered as (RP-C3266), landed from Manila to Davao. During the approach the pilot had over corrected his alignment with the center line and caused the aircraft's alignment to be on the right half portion of the runway. The pilot mistook the runway's right edge lights for the unlit center lights and thus caused him to instead land on the grass. The nose landing gear was heavily damaged. All of the 165 passengers and the 6 crew survived. The aircraft was repaired and was eventually returned to service.
On 25 July 2013, a Ural Airlines Airbus A320-214 (VQ-BDJ) had its nose gear rotated 90 degrees while taxiing at Koltsovo International Airport.
 On 5 January 2014, Air India Flight 890, an Airbus A320-231, was landing in zero-visibility weather at Jaipur International Airport. The plane missed the runway, blew some tyres and hit some trees with the left wing. Everyone on board was unharmed. The plane was written off.
 On 14 March 2014, US Airways Flight 1702, flown by an Airbus A320-214 registered N113UW, attempted to take off from Philadelphia, PA, on a flight to Fort Lauderdale, FL, but was unable to take off normally and struck its tail on the runway. After reaching 20 feet off the ground, the pilots rejected takeoff, causing the nose gear to collapse when touching back down on the runway. No one was injured, but the plane was damaged beyond repair. Take-off was aborted because the pilot was confused by warning messages, which resulted from incorrect cockpit data inputs while taxiing.
 On 28 December 2014, Indonesia AirAsia Flight 8501, using an Airbus A320-216, from Juanda International Airport, Surabaya to Changi International Airport, Singapore, crashed into the Java Sea between the islands of Belitung and Borneo, killing all 162 on board. The cause was initially a malfunction in two of the plane's rudder travel limiter units, followed by incorrect actions by the crew which eventually led the plane to stall while encountering a thunderstorm. The crew ignored the recommended procedure to deal with the problem and reset a circuit breaker which further disengaged the autopilot and other flight protection systems which contributed to the subsequent loss of control. Investigators have stated that the condition of the FAC (Flight Augmentation Control) on the flight "was persistent enough" for the captain to do such actions.
 On 24 March 2015, Germanwings Flight 9525, using an Airbus A320-211, flying from Barcelona to Düsseldorf crashed near Digne in the Southern French Alps, killing all 150 on board. The crash was deliberately caused by the co-pilot Andreas Lubitz, who had previously been treated for suicidal tendencies and been declared "unfit to work" by a doctor. Despite this, Lubitz kept the declaration hidden from his employer and reported for duty.
 On 29 March 2015, Air Canada Flight 624, using an Airbus A320-211, flying from Toronto to Halifax carrying 138 people crash landed short of the runway hitting a power pole and an antenna array, the aircraft regained flight momentum before slamming down on to the end of the runway at Halifax Stanfield International Airport where the landing gear collapsed. The weather was poor with heavy snow and low visibility. The aircraft was badly damaged and 23 people suffered non-life-threatening injuries.
 On 14 April 2015, Asiana Airlines Flight 162, an Airbus A320-232 (registration HL7762) with 82 people on board, lost height on final approach to Hiroshima Airport in Mihara, Japan, struck an instrument landing system localizer antenna, and skidded onto the runway on its tail, spinning 180 degrees before coming to a stop. Its main landing gear collapsed and the aircraft suffered damage to its left wing and left engine. No one was killed, but 27 of the 82 people on board were injured, of which one serious. The aircraft was flying from Seoul, Incheon International Airport in South Korea
On 25 April 2015, Turkish Airlines Flight 1878, operated by A320-232, TC-JPE was severely damaged in a landing accident at Ataturk International Airport, Istanbul. The aircraft aborted the first hard landing, which inflicted engine and gear damage. On the second attempt at landing, the right gear collapsed and the aircraft rolled off the runway spinning 180 degrees. All on board evacuated without injury.
On 29 March 2016, EgyptAir Flight 181, operated by Airbus A320-232 SU-GCB was hijacked during a Flight from Borg El Arab Airport, Alexandria to Cairo International Airport. The aircraft landed at Larnaca International Airport, Cyprus.
On 19 May 2016, EgyptAir Flight 804, operated by A320-232 SU-GCC, suffered a cockpit fire and crashed into the Mediterranean Sea 20 minutes before its scheduled arrival at Cairo International Airport from Charles de Gaulle Airport. All 66 on board were killed.
On 23 December 2016, Afriqiyah Airways Flight 209, operated by A320-214 5A-ONB was hijacked whilst on a flight from Sebha Airport to Tripoli International Airport and diverted to Malta International Airport.
On 7 July 2017, Air Canada Flight 759, carrying 135 passengers and five crew, was nearly involved in a major accident at San Francisco International Airport in San Mateo County, California, from Toronto Pearson International Airport. The flight had been cleared by air traffic control to land on San Francisco's runway 28R, however missed the runway; on final approach the aircraft had lined up with a parallel taxiway on which four fully loaded and fueled passenger airplanes were stopped awaiting takeoff clearance. The flight crew initiated a go-around, after which it landed without further incident.
On 13 October 2017, Cebu Pacific Flight 461 suffered a runway excursion after landing on runway 20 at Iloilo Airport, Philippines. The aircraft skidded off the runway. All 180 people on board survived.
On 28 February 2018, a Smartlynx Estonia Airbus A320-200, registration ES-SAN performing training flights MYX-9001 at Tallinn Airport (Estonia) with 7 crew, was doing touch-and-gos at Tallinn's runway 08. After about a dozen touch-and-gos, the aircraft touched down on runway 08 at 17:03L (15:03Z), accelerated again, lifted off but could not climb out, touching down again very hard with sparks and flames visible while it became airborne again. The crew declared an emergency, positioned for landing and touched down  short of runway 26, bursting all tyres. The aircraft veered left off the runway. Two occupants received minor injuries; the aircraft sustained substantial damage and was written off.
On 23 April 2018, Cebu Pacific Flight 849, an Airbus A320-200, flew from Manila to Zamboanga with 172 people on board, got stuck on the runway when the nose gear failed and the plane could not turn. The airport was closed for several hours until the plane could be removed.
On 9 April 2019, Asiana Airlines Flight 8703, an Airbus A320-232, suffered a 90 degree rotation of the nose landing gear on landing at Gwangju Airport’s runway 04R. The tires and flanges suffered serious damage.

2020s 
On 22 May 2020, Pakistan International Airlines Flight 8303, an Airbus A320-214, landed at Jinnah International Airport gear-up and executed a go-around. A few minutes later, both engines had shut down. The plane crashed into Model Colony near Karachi on final approach to Jinnah International Airport for an attempted emergency landing, killing 97 of 99 on board, as well as killing 1 on the ground.
On 26 January 2021, Pegasus Airlines Flight 939, an Airbus A320-251N, landed on runway 15 at Basel Mulhouse-Freiburg EuroAirport with the nose landing gear rotated 90 degrees.
On 6 March 2021, Batik Air Flight 6803, an Airbus A320-214, has its nose gear rotated 90 degrees while taxiing at Jambi Airport and took off from the runway. The plane could not retract the landing gear after taking off from Jambi Airport and had to return back. The plane landed with its nose gear rotated 90 degrees. The passengers and crew members did not receive any injuries and exited the plane using stairs on the runway.
On 18 March 2022, Viva Aerobus Flight 4343, an Airbus A320-232, suffered a nose landing gear collapse while making a 180 turn to line up for takeoff from runway 22 at Puerto Vallarta-Gustavo D. Ordaz Airport, Mexico. All 127 on board safely evacuated the plane.
On 29 March 2022, the nose gear of LATAM Airlines Flight 4292, an Airbus A320-214, was locked at a 90-degree angle on takeoff. The tires were damaged, and the plane returned to the airport. There were no injuries on board.
On 6 July 2022, British Airways Flight 820, an Airbus A320-232, caught fire as it was landing at Copenhagen Airport. Airport firefighters put out the fire. They had to use foam as well. People in the terminal buildings were able to record the footage.
On 10 July 2022, Spirit Airlines Flight 383, an Airbus A320-232, had its left main landing gear wheels catch on fire while landing on Runway 28 at Hartsfield-Jackson Atlanta International Airport, Georgia. No injuries were reported and the aircraft was towed away for maintenance.
On 2 September 2022, engine 2 of TAP Air Portugal Flight 1492, an Airbus A320-251N, struck a motorcycle that crossed the runway at Ahmed Sékou Touré International Airport during the plane’s landing roll. Both riders on the motorcycle perished, however everyone on board the plane were unharmed. Engine 2 of the plane was damaged from the collision.
On 26 October 2022, LATAM Chile Flight 1325, an Airbus A320-214, was on approach to Asunción-Silvio Pettirossi International Airport when the aircraft encountered a hail storm. The aircraft lost most of its nose radome, suffered damage to its windshield and lost both engines which led to the Ram Air Turbine being deployed. The aircraft made an emergency landing at Asunción with no injuries aboard.
On 18 November 2022, LATAM Perú Flight 2213, an Airbus A320-271N, was in its takeoff roll at runway 16 of Jorge Chávez International Airport when the crew spotted a fire truck crossing the runway and rejected the takeoff. The aircraft was unable to avoid the fire truck and struck it with its right hand engine, killing both fire fighters aboard the firetruck, and causing the right main landing gear of the aircraft to collapse and the right hand engine separating from the collision, which started a fire. Everyone aboard the aircraft survived with  40 people sustaining injuries. The aircraft was written off making it the first hull loss of the Airbus A320neo.

A321

2000s 
On 16 November 2001 Middle East Airlines Flight ME304 operated by an Airbus A321-200, from Beirut International Airport to Cairo International Airport when it sustained damage during a tail strike accident upon landing at Cairo, this airframe would be destroyed nearly 14 years later midflight as Metrojet Flight 9268.
 On 21 March 2003, TransAsia Airways Flight 543, an Airbus A321 on a flight from Taipei Songshan Airport, collided with a truck on the runway while landing at Tainan Airport. The 175 passengers and crew were evacuated unharmed but the two people in the truck were injured. The aircraft was severely damaged and was written off.

2010s 
 On 28 July 2010, Airblue Flight 202, an Airbus A321 flying from Karachi to Islamabad, crashed in the Margalla Hills, Islamabad, Pakistan. The weather was poor with low visibility. During a non-standard self-created approach below the minimum descent altitude the aircraft crashed into the ground after the captain ignored 21 cockpit warnings to pull-up. 146 passengers and six crew were on board the aircraft. There were no survivors. The commander, Pervez Iqbal Chaudry, was one of Airblue's most senior pilots with more than 35 years experience. The accident was the first fatal accident involving the A321.
 On 5 November 2014, Lufthansa Flight 1829, an Airbus A321 was flying from Bilbao to Munich when the aircraft, while on autopilot, lowered the nose into a descent reaching 4000 fpm. The uncommanded pitch-down was caused by two angle of attack sensors that were jammed in their positions, causing the fly by wire protection to believe the aircraft entered a stall while it climbed through FL310. The Alpha Protection activated, forcing the aircraft to pitch down, which could not be corrected even by full stick input. The crew disconnected the related Air Data Units and were able to recover the aircraft. The event was also reported in the German press several days before the Germanwings crash. The German Federal Bureau of Aircraft Accident Investigation (BFU) reported on the incident on 17 March 2015 in a Bulletin publishing the flight data recorder and pitch control data in English and German. As a result of this incident an Airworthiness Directive made mandatory the Aircraft Flight Manual amended by the procedure the manufacturer had described in the FOT and the OEB and a subsequent information of flight crews prior to the next flight. EASA issued a similar Airworthiness Directive for the aircraft types A330/340.
 On 15 August 2015, American Airlines Flight 1851, an Airbus 321-231, suffered a loss of lift and hit the runway approach lights followed by a tail strike onto the runway surface while attempting to go-around at Charlotte-Douglas International Airport after experiencing a small microburst on approach. It was determined that the appropriate windshear precautions were not applied.
 On 31 October 2015, Metrojet Flight 9268, an Airbus A321-231 operated by Russian airline company Kogalymavia (branded as Metrojet), crashed in the Hasana area of central Sinai, Egypt on its way from Sharm El Sheikh, Egypt to St. Petersburg, Russia. There were 224 people on board (217 passengers and 7 crew). No one survived. The flight disappeared from radar 23 minutes after take-off. ADS-B-tracking of the A321 onboard flight sensors by Flightradar24 indicates that the flight was at 31,000 feet before a rapid descent. Newer reports say it broke up in midair, and that ISIL has claimed that it brought down the aircraft.
 On 2 February 2016, Daallo Airlines Flight 159, an Airbus A321-111 flying from Mogadishu to Djibouti, suffered an in-flight explosion five minutes after takeoff, injuring two passengers; the explosion blew a hole in the fuselage, causing a passenger to fall out of the plane; the passenger's severely burnt body was found on the ground in the village of Dhiiqaaley near Balad, Somalia. The aircraft returned to Mogadishu and was able to land safely. Investigators determined that explosion was caused by a suicide bomber who detonated explosives. The bomber was the same passenger who fell out of the aircraft.
On 8 December 2017, Airbus A321-231 A7-AIB of Qatar Airways was damaged beyond economic repair by a fire at Hamad International Airport, Doha, Qatar.
On 29 November 2018, VietJet Air Flight 356, an Airbus A321-271N (VN-A653), lost both wheels of its nosegear in a hard landing at Buon Ma Thuot Airport, Đắk Lắk Province, after a flight from Ho Chi Minh city. Passengers were evacuated via emergency slides, 6 people were injured.
On 10 April 2019, American Airlines Flight 300, an Airbus A321-231 (WL) (Registered as N114NN), had its left wing hit the ground and a marker during takeoff at John F. Kennedy International Airport. The plane safely took off and returned to the airport. No one on board was injured, but the plane was written off.
There were no fatalities, but 23 people were hospitalized.

2020s 
 On 26 February 2020, Titan Airways Airbus A321-211, registration G-POWN, encountered problems with both engines shortly after takeoff from Gatwick Airport. The flight was a positioning operation without passengers en route to Stansted Airport. The aircraft made a successful emergency landing back at Gatwick Airport. There were no injuries. The cause was a fueling error in which an excessive quantity of Kathon had been added to the fuel.

References

Airbus A320 family
Lists of aviation accidents and incidents